Mark Taylor (born in Windsor, England) is a British record producer and songwriter. He has worked with artists such as Tina Turner, Lady Gaga, Nelly Furtado, Lionel Richie, Hall & Oates, Cher, Rod Stewart, Belinda Carlisle, Daniel Bedingfield, Ronan Keating, Enrique Iglesias, Britney Spears, James Morrison,
Kylie Minogue, Jennifer Lopez. Taylor worked on Cher's 1998 album Believe, which won a Grammy for its title track. The album went on to sell over 20 million copies worldwide. The song "Believe" featured an early example of the vocal effect Auto tune.

Songwriting and production credits

References

Grammy Award winners
English record producers
Living people
English songwriters
Year of birth missing (living people)